EB Green may refer to:
 Edward Brodhead Green (1855–1950), American architect
 EB Green or EB green, green duct tape used by defense contractor Electric Boat